Plumstead is a residential suburb situated in the Southern Suburbs of Cape Town in the Western Cape Province of South Africa.

History 
Plumstead was first mentioned when, in 1762, a large portion of the land beyond Wynberg and the Constantia Valley was granted to the free burghers Hendrick Jergens and Johan Barrens, who were Dutch settlers. They called the land 'Rust' (Rest) and 'Werk' (Work).

Twenty years later the land was granted to Hendrick Bouman Brigeraad.

After the decline of the Dutch East India Company, the British occupied the Cape.

An Englishman, Henry Batt, arrived in 1807 and bought 'Rust and Werk' and renamed it Plumstead, after a district of London. He farmed the area for twenty six years, and died in 1833.
The farm Plumstead was sub-divided and bought by Messrs. Higgs, Loubscher and Southey. Today, Plumstead consists of a mix of houses built in the 1940s and 1950s and more modern residences.

Geography 
The suburb is bordered to the east by the M5 expressway and to the west by the suburb of Constantia.

Education
The suburb contains a number of educational institutions.

Schools:

 John Graham Primary School
 Timour Hall Primary School
 Plumstead Preparatory School
 Plumstead High School
 South Peninsula High School
 Norman Henshilwood High School

Tertiary institutions:

 Cape Town College of Fashion Design

Shopping
Plumstead has multiple small shopping centers within its boundaries;

 Pick n Pay Centre
 Gabriel Place
 The Village Square
 Checkers Centre
 Richmond Centre
 Prospur Centre
 3Arts Village Shopping Centre

Sports
Plumstead incorporates the Cape Town Cricket Club and Plumstead Tennis Club, both located on Victoria Road.

Governance
Plumstead is divided between wards 62, 63 and 73 of the City of Cape Town metropolitan municipality. The ward councillors are Elizabeth Brunette, Monty Oliver and Carmen Siebritz, respectively, all members of the Democratic Alliance. The Plumstead Municipal Offices are located on Victoria Road.

Gallery

References

 Constantiaberg Bulletin, 25 August 2005; Pg 5.

Suburbs of Cape Town